Mannina Doni is a 1992 Indian Kannada-language romantic drama film directed by M. S. Rajashekar and written by T. K. Rama Rao. The film stars Ambareesh, Sudharani and Vanitha Vasu. The film, produced by Sandesh Nagaraj, was widely appreciated for its songs tuned by Hamsalekha and lead actors performances upon release.

Plot synopsis
Karthik, a novelist, meets Sowbhagya, a young woman, on his visit to the meadows, and both fall in love. Despite her father's disapproval, the two get married and head to Mysuru, where a mystery begins to unfold.

Cast 
 Ambareesh as Karthik
 Sudharani as Sowbhagya
 Vanitha Vasu
 Umashree
 Jai Jagadish as Jagadish
 Mukhyamantri Chandru
 Vajramuni
 Ramesh Bhat
 Chi. Guru Dutt as Sudhakar
 Avinash
 Pandari Bai
 K. S. Ashwath
 Thoogudeepa Srinivas
 Girija Lokesh
 Ashalatha

Soundtrack 
The music of the film was composed and lyrics written by Hamsalekha and the entire soundtrack was received extremely well. Audio was released on Lahari Music.

References

External links 

 Songs

1992 films
1990s Kannada-language films
Indian romantic drama films
Films scored by Hamsalekha
Films directed by M. S. Rajashekar
1992 romantic drama films